Poppo I (died 839–841) was a Frankish count in the Grapfeld (Grabfeld) from 819–839.  As a grandson of Heimrich, Count in the Upper Rheingau, he was a descendant of the Robertian count Cancor, and therefore a member of the Frankish House of Babenberg (Popponids).

Poppo was a "leading man of the Franks" in 838-839, when he and several other noblemen, including Gebhard, Count of the Lahngau, Count Adalbert of Metz and Archbishop Odgar of Mainz opposed Louis the German's revolt against Emperor Louis the Pious.

Poppo was probably the father (or grandfather) of Henry of Franconia, Duke Poppo (II) of Thuringia and Egino.

Sources
The Annals of Fulda. (Manchester Medieval series, Ninth-Century Histories, Volume II.) Reuter, Timothy (trans.) Manchester: Manchester University Press, 1992.

Counts of Germany
Babenberg
9th-century rulers in Europe
9th-century deaths
Year of birth unknown
Year of death unknown